At the Altar is a 1909 American silent drama film directed by D. W. Griffith. The film was shot in Fort Lee, New Jersey where early film studios in America's first motion picture industry were based at the beginning of the 20th century. A print of this film is in the film archive of the Library of Congress.

Plot
A rejected admirer sets up a trap to kill his sweetheart and her fiance before they married and then commit suicide, but before he passes away, he leaves a confession. The confession is found on time and a police man runs to the church to save the couple.

Cast
 Marion Leonard as Minnie, the Daughter
 David Miles - Father
 Charles Inslee as Grigo, the Suitor
 Herbert Yost as Giuseppe Cassella
 Anita Hendrie as Mother
 Dorothy West as Minnie's Friend/Dinner Guest

See also
 List of American films of 1909
 1909 in film
 D. W. Griffith filmography

References

External links

1909 films
1909 drama films
1909 short films
Silent American drama films
American silent short films
American black-and-white films
Films directed by D. W. Griffith
Biograph Company films
Films shot in Fort Lee, New Jersey
1900s American films